Melperone (Bunil (PT), Buronil (AT, BE, CZ, DK, FL†, NL†, NO†, SE), Eunerpan (DE)) is an atypical antipsychotic of the butyrophenone chemical class, making it structurally related to the typical antipsychotic haloperidol. It first entered clinical use in 1960s.

Marketing and indications
It has been tried in treatment-resistant cases of schizophrenia with some (albeit limited) success. It has also been reported effective in the treatment of L-DOPA and other forms of psychosis in Parkinson's disease (although a multicentre, double-blind, placebo-controlled study conducted in 2012 failed to support these findings). It is also known to possess anxiolytic properties. It is marketed in the following countries:

 Austria
 Belgium
 Czech Republic
 Denmark
 Estonia
 Finland
 Germany
 Iceland
 Lithuania
 Latvia
 Portugal
 Sweden

Adverse effects
Melperone is reported to produce significantly less weight gain than clozapine and approximately as much weight gain as typical antipsychotics. It is also purported to produce around as much prolactin secretion as clozapine (which is virtually nil). It is also purported to produce sedative effects and QT interval prolongation. It is also known to produce less extrapyramidal side effects than the first-generation (typical) antipsychotic, thiothixene. It can also produce (usually relatively mild) dry mouth.

Other common adverse effects include

 Constipation
 Diarrhea
 Nausea
 Vomiting
 Appetite loss
 Hypersalivation (drooling)
 Extrapyramidal side effects (e.g. tremor, dystonia, hypokinesis, akathisia, dyskinesias)
 Insomnia
 Agitation
 Headache
 Dizziness
 Fatigue
 Miosis
 Mydriasis
 Blurred vision
 Elevated liver enzymes (esp. ALT and GGTP)

Rare adverse effects include
 Tardive dyskinesia
 Neuroleptic malignant syndrome
 Blood dyscrasias (pancytopenia, agranulocytosis, leukopenia, thrombocytopenia, etc.)

Unknown frequency adverse effects include

 Seizures (probably rare/uncommon)
 Increased intraocular pressure
 Intrahepatic cholestasis (probably rare)
 Orthostatic hypotension (probably common)
 Arrhythmias
 Rash
 Hyperprolactinemia (which can lead to e.g. galactorrhea, gynecomastia)
 Weight gain
 Increased appetite

Interactions 
Melperone is reported to be a CYP2D6 inhibitor.

Pharmacology
Melperone binds to the dopamine D2 receptor, just like all other clinically-utilized antipsychotics, but it does so with a very low affinity and hence may be liable to rapidly dissociate from the D2 receptor hence potentially giving it the profile of an atypical antipsychotic.

Synthesis

For the last step of the synthesis the sidechain 4-Chloro-4'-Fluorobutyrophenone [3874-54-2] (1) is attached to 
4-Methylpiperidine (4-Pipecoline) [626-58-4] (2).

See also 
 Pipamperone

References

External links 
 PubChem Substance
 

Atypical antipsychotics
Fluoroarenes
Piperidines
Butyrophenone antipsychotics
Dopamine antagonists
Serotonin receptor antagonists
Alpha-1 blockers
Alpha-2 blockers